Kies may refer to:

Software
 Samsung Kies, a software application to connect a Samsung smartphone with a computer

Places
 Cēsis, a town in Latvia
 Kies (crater), a crater on the Moon named for Johann Kies
 Kies, Switzerland, a place near Schwanden in the Swiss canton of Glarus

People with the surname
Constance Kies (1934–1993), American dietitian and nutritionist
Cosette Kies (born 1936), American writer, librarian, and academic
Johann Kies (1713–1781), German astronomer
 Mary Dixon Kies (1752–1837), American inventor
 Pauline Kies (1918–1999), South African botanist